Hardin County Schools (HCS) is a school district headquartered in a portion of Radcliff, Kentucky that has an Elizabethtown mailing address. It serves most of Hardin County. However areas in Elizabethtown are instead zoned to Elizabethtown Independent School District. Additionally Fort Knox residents are zoned to Department of Defense Education Activity (DoDEA) schools.

History
In 2020 the county school district absorbed the former West Point Independent School District.

Schools
 Middle-high schools
 College View Campus
 High schools
 Central Hardin High School
 John Hardin High School
 North Hardin High School
 Hardin County Schools Early College and Career Center
 Middle schools
 Bluegrass Middle School
 East Hardin Middle School
 J. T. Alton Middle School
 North Middle School
 West Hardin Middle School
 Elementary schools
 Cecilia Valley Elementary School
 Creekside Elementary School
 G. C. Burkhead Elementary School
 Heartland Elementary School
 Lakewood Elementary School
 Lincoln Trail Elementary School
 Meadow View Elementary School
 New Highland Elementary School
 North Park Elementary School
 Radcliff Elementary School
 Rineyville Elementary School
 Vine Grove Elementary School
 Woodland Elementary School

See also
Others in the county:
 Elizabethtown Independent Schools
 West Point Independent School District, which closed at the end of the 2019–20 school year and merged into HCS

References

External links
 
School districts in Kentucky
Education in Hardin County, Kentucky